Kewabi Rural LLG is a local-level government (LLG) of Southern Highlands Province, Papua New Guinea.

Wards
01. Kepiki 1
02. Kepiki 2
03. Wangai
04. Yate
05. Muli 1
06. Muli 2
07. Paibo
08. Yarena
09. Pale
10. Mambi
11. Munku 1
12. Munku 2
13. Makura 1
14. Mugura 2
15. Kirene
16. Kumbeme 1
17. Kumbeme 2
18. Ponowi 1
19. Ponowi 2
20. Munkumapo
21. Paibo 2
22. Kirene 2
23. Wangai 2
24. Mambi 2
25. Yarena 2
26. Mungumapu 2
28. Pale 2

References

Local-level governments of Southern Highlands Province